Under the Roofs of St. Pauli (German: Unter den Dächern von St. Pauli) is a 1970 West German crime drama film directed by Alfred Weidenmann and starring Jean-Claude Pascal, Joseph Offenbach and Werner Peters.

Cast

References

Bibliography 
 James Robert Parish & Kingsley Canham. Film Directors Guide: Western Europe. Scarecrow Press, 1976.

External links 
 

1970 films
West German films
German crime films
1970 crime films
1970s German-language films
Films directed by Alfred Weidenmann
Films shot in Hamburg
Films set in Hamburg
1970s German films